The Abama Open de Canarias was a golf tournament on the European and Challenge Tours which was only played in 2005, and was last of four dual ranking events that year. It was held at the Abama Golf Club in Tenerife, Spain, during the same week in October as the WGC-American Express Championship.

England's John Bickerton won the event, his first win on the European Tour, and collected the €75,000 (£51,104) first prize. The total prize fund was towards the lower end of the scale on the European Tour, at €450,000, but was the third richest tournament on the Challenge Tour that season.

The European Tour had previously visited the Canary Islands between 2002 and 2004 for the Canarias Open de España, the Turespana Masters Open de Canarias in 1997, and for the Turespana Open De Canaria, originally the Tenerife Open, from 1989 to 1995.

Winners

Notes

References

External links
Coverage on the European Tour's official site

Former European Tour events
Golf tournaments in Spain
2005 establishments in Spain
2005 disestablishments in Spain
Defunct sports competitions in Spain